Ayodeji Richard Makun, also known by his stage name A.Y, is a Nigerian actor, comedian, radio and TV presenter, writer, producer and film director. Born on 19 August 1971, he hails from Ifon, Ose local government in Ondo State. He is the host of the A.Y live shows and A.Y comedy skits. His first movie, 30 Days in Atlanta was produced by him and directed by Robert O. Peters. He was made a U.N Peace Ambassador. In 2009, he was made United Nations Peace Ambassador. He is also the CEO of Corporate World Entertainment Nigeria.

Education
Ayo Makun attended Delta State University, Abraka, Delta State, Nigeria. He graduated (after spending nine years) in 2003 as a theatre arts student. While he was a student, A.Y won awards such as the most fashionable student on campus (1999 and 2000); best show-biz promoter (2001); the most celebrated student on campus (2001) and the Jaycee Club socio-personality award (2003).

Career
Ayo Makun came into spotlight after being Alibaba Akporobome's personal assistant and event manager. He wrote going "A.Y wire" as a guest columnist in The Sun (Nigeria) and Gbenga Adeyinka's "Laugh Mattaz".

Personal life
Ayo Makun is the oldest male child from a family of seven. He married his wife, Mabel in November, 2008. They are blessed with two children,Michelle Makun and Ayomide Makun.

Professional life
Ayo Makun directs and acts in one of Nigeria's sitcom, AY's crib with Alex Ekubo, Venita Akpofure, Buchi Franklin, and Justice Nuagbe. He also hosts comedy shows, AY Live featuring comedians like Bovi, Helen Paul, Basketmouth and many other comedians. Ayo Makun is also the Chief Executive Officer of Corporate World entertainment, Nigeria. He also owns a club house. As an investor in stand-up comedy, he has paved the way for upcoming comedians through his AY "Open Mic Challenge".

Events
He co-hosted at the 2018 Golden Movie Awards Africa held at the Movenpick Ambassador Hotel in Accra, Ghana with Joselyn Dumas.

Awards

2008 
Comedian of the year: Diamond Awards for Comedy 
Comedian of the year: Teens Favorite
Comedian of the year: MBG Abuja Merit Awards
Comedian of the year: National Daily Awards
Comedian of the year: Arsenal Award for Excellence
Comedian of the year: Mode Men of the year Awards

2009 
U.N Peace Ambassador.

2010 
Comedian of the year: Nigerian Entertainment Awards

2013 
Most creative Entrepreneur of the year, (comedy category): Creative Entrepreneurs Association of Nigeria (CEAN)
Best Event A.Y Live: NELAS Awards 2018, United Kingdom

Selected filmography

See also
List of Yoruba people
List of Nigerian comedians

References 

Nigerian male comedians
Nigerian male film actors
Yoruba male actors
Delta State University, Abraka alumni
21st-century Nigerian male actors
Living people
1971 births
Actors from Ondo State
Nigerian film directors
Nigerian film producers
Nigerian male television actors
Male actors from Delta State
Nigerian media personalities
People from Ondo State
Nigerian television personalities
Nigerian film award winners
Nigerian television presenters
Nigerian radio presenters
Nigerian television producers
Nigerian writers
21st-century Nigerian businesspeople
Nigerian businesspeople